The Prince de Neufchatel was a fast sailing United States schooner-rigged privateer, built in New York by Adam and Noah Brown circa 1812. She is a fine example of the peak of development of the armed schooner. Neufchatel operated in mainly European waters, preying on British shipping during the War of 1812.  Noted for her speed, at one time she outran seventeen men-of-war. In 1813, operating in the English Channel, she took nine British prizes in quick succession. She also delivered a crushing defeat to the boats of a British frigate that tried to capture her. The British finally captured her in December 1814; she was broken up in 1815.

Construction 

Her design is believed to be due to Christian Bergh. She had a hermaphrodite rig, i.e., she combined the rigs of a schooner and a brigantine. "She carried four sails on the foremast, one square sail on the main, and a large fore-and-aft sail with gaff abaft the fore, with large staysails over and three jibs. Her spanker boom projected far beyond the stern."( Prince of Neuchatel)

After her capture her design caught the Navy Board's interest and on 10 April 1815 it ordered Woolwich Dock to build a copy. However, with the end of the War of 1812 and the Napoleonic Wars, the copy was never built.

Career 
On 11 October 1814, under Captain John Ordronaux, she engaged in one of the most violent privateer clashes of the war.  Becalmed on the south side of Nantucket, she became vulnerable. Captain Henry Hope of  thereupon sent 111 men in five boats to cut out the privateersman, defended by 40 Americans.  After 20 minutes of savage fighting, the British surrendered.  British casualties amounted to 28 killed, 37 wounded, and 28 taken prisoner.  The Americans reported 7 killed and 24 wounded.  Ordronaux put most of the wounded and prisoners off at Nantucket, and "limped into Boston".

Under the strain of her large sail area, her masts sprung (many Baltimore clippers experienced problems due to their extremely large rigs). Not being able to outrun the British frigates, Prince de Neufchatel surrendered. John Ordronaux was apparently not her captain at the time; her commander was Nicholas Millin. At the time of her capture, Prince de Neufchatel was armed with 18 guns and had a crew of 129 men. She was eight days out of Boston.<ref> HMS Leander - Captain's Log</ref>

Fate
The British took Prince de Neufchatel back to England. There she was damaged beyond repair on the back of the sill of a dock gate as she was being undocked. As a result she was never commissioned into the Royal Navy. She was broken up in 1815.

 Legacy 
The clipper Red Rover, built in 1830, was modeled after Prince de Neufchatel.

Notes

Citations

References
 
 Gardiner, Robert (1999) Warships of the Napoleonic Era.'' (Annapolis:  Naval Institute Press).
 

 

War of 1812 ships of the United States
Ships built in New York (state)
1813 ships
Privateer ships